Gerard Evans (1955–1979) was one of the "Disappeared" of The Troubles. Having gone missing in March 1979, his body was recovered 31 years later in October 2010.

Early life
Gerard Evans, known as "Gerry", was a 24 year old painter and decorator from Crossmaglen, County Armagh, in Northern Ireland.

Disappearance
Evans was kidnapped by the Provisional Irish Republican Army in March 1979 whilst hitch-hiking in the Castleblaney neighbourhood in County Monaghan, Republic of Ireland. After an interrogation by a kangaroo court involving a party of twelve local PIRA members on the accusation of being an intelligence agent for the British Government in the Armagh/Monaghan district, Evans was taken at night into the County Louth landscape, where, after pleading for mercy from his kidnappers, and being permitted to make a last prayer, he was shot in the back of the head. His body was afterwards illicitly buried in an unmarked grave in a peat bog at Carrickrobbin, near Hackballcross in County Louth, five miles from his home in Crossmaglen, the decision having been taken by the Provisional IRA to deny involvement with his disappearance and conceal the evidence of his murder to avoid alienating the community of the village of Crossmaglen, where the surname of Evans was common.

Recovery of the body
In October 2010 the Sunday Tribune journalist Suzanne Breen published a story that she had received information about the location of Evans' body from an ex-member of the Provisional IRA's "South Armagh Brigade", the source also giving the details of Evans' kidnap and murder. After an extensive search of the vicinity indicated the Garda Síochána located Evans' body on 15 October 2010. The source stated that their decision in coming forward with the information was influenced by the 2007 murder of Paul Quinn.

Evans' funeral took place at St. Patrick's Church in Crossmaglen on 4 December 2010; he was buried in the church's graveyard.

See also
Independent Commission for the Location of Victims' Remains
List of solved missing person cases

References

1955 births
1970s missing person cases
1979 deaths
British people murdered abroad
Enforced disappearances in Northern Ireland
Deaths by firearm in the Republic of Ireland
House painters
Kidnapped people from Northern Ireland
Missing person cases in Ireland
Murder victims from Northern Ireland
People declared dead in absentia
People from Crossmaglen
People killed by the Provisional Irish Republican Army
Terrorism deaths in the Republic of Ireland
1979 murders in the Republic of Ireland